Abraham Polonski (born 1913), also known as Pol or Maurice Ferrer, was one of the founders of the French Jewish Resistance movement, having previously worked as an electrical engineer in Toulouse.

By June 1940, the French army had surrendered to Germany. Polonski and others established an underground organization called La Main Forte, meaning "The Strong Hand".

By 1942 Polonski and Labor Movement Zionist activists also established the Armee Juive (AJ), or Jewish Army, which was a commando force composed of the Zionist youth movement members. During 1943–1944, the Jewish Army helped some hundreds of its members to successfully escape to Spain and then Palestine. The group fought in Toulouse, Nice, Lyon, and Paris areas, attacking informers who had collaborated with the Gestapo and helped liberate France in the summer of 1944.

They were funded to the sum of tens of millions of francs by the Jewish Agency and from the American Jewish Joint Distribution Committee.

Polonski went on to become a Haganah commander of the AJ in France and North Africa.

References

Sources
 Abraham Polonski and the Jewish resistance in France during the Second World War. Yehuda Ben-David, Yaʻel Zaidman, Miśrad ha-bitaḥon, 2002
Tsilla Hershco, Those who Walk in Darkness will See the Light, the Jewish Resistance in France During the Holocaust and the Creation of Israel: 1940-1949 (Hebrew, 2003, 2018). 

1913 births
Possibly living people
French Resistance members
Jews in the French resistance
French Zionists
Russian Jews
Emigrants from the Russian Empire to France